The NZR T class was a class of steam locomotive used in New Zealand; of the "Consolidation" type, popular in North America, especially with the narrow gauge Denver and Rio Grande Western Railroad.

History
The Baldwin and Rogers locomotives reflected the styling adopted in the 1870s by American builders with elements from the Renaissance Revival and Neo-Baroque architectural styles, and with Islamic e.g. Moorish (from Alhambra) influences. Bold colours and painted decorations were used. Many Baldwin locomotives were in Olive Green ground colour, although the Baldwin N and O classes of the 1880s had Tuscan Red ground colour.

In service

Withdrawal and disposal
The first T class locomotive was withdrawn in 1922, with the last example withdrawn in 1924. Some managed to survive long enough to be dumped or have components dumped when the NZR started dumping locomotives for embankment protection in 1926.

References

Citations

Bibliography

 
 
 

2-8-0 locomotives
3 ft 6 in gauge locomotives of New Zealand
Baldwin locomotives
railway locomotives introduced in 1879
scrapped locomotives
T class